Carol Bishop may refer to:

 Carol Bishop-Gwyn, Canadian writer
 Carole Bishop or Kelly Bishop (born 1944), American actress and dancer